TNT is trinitrotoluene, an explosive chemical compound.

TNT or TnT may also refer to:

Entertainment

Music
 T.N.T. (album), 1975 by AC/DC
 "T.N.T." (song), by the hard rock band AC/DC
 TNT Boys, a Filipino boy band
 TNT (Norwegian band), a Norwegian hard rock band
 TNT (TNT album), their self-titled debut album
 TNT (EP)
 TNT (Brazilian band), a Brazilian rockabilly/pop rock band
 TNT I, their first self-titled debut album
 TNT II, their second self-titled album
 TNT (Tortoise album), 1998
 TNT (Tanya Tucker album), 1978

Television 
 TNT (American TV network)
 TNT (Australian TV station), Tasmania
 TNT (Russian TV channel)
 TNT Serie, former name of German TV channel WarnerTV Serie
 AEW TNT Championship, American wrestling
 Tawag ng Tanghalan, a singing competition in the Philippines
 Tuesday Night Titans, a 1980s wrestling TV show
 Digital terrestrial television in France (Television Numerique Terrestre)

Other entertainment
 TNT (character), a 1940s superhero
 TNT (magazine), for non-citizen UK residents
 TnT (magazine), a 1980s Tunnels & Trolls fanzine
 Transsexual News Telegraph, a magazine
 T.N.T. (1997 film), with Olivier Gruner

Companies and organizations
 TNT Airways, later ASL Airlines Belgium
 TNT (clothing), Israel
 TNT Tropang Giga, a Philippine basketball team
 Tamil New Tigers, a Tamil organization
 Terror Against Terror (Hebrew: Terror Neged Terror), a terrorist organization in Israel
Tried-N-True Pro Wrestling, a wrestling promotion
 TNT N.V., later PostNL, a Dutch mail delivery company
 Thomas Nationwide Transport, later TNT Limited, then TNT N.V. in 1998
 TNT Express, split from TNT N.V. in 2011
 Koninklijke TNT Post, the Netherlands, until 2011

Technology
 TNT (cellular service), in the Philippines
 TNT (instant messenger), a messaging client
 Template Numerical Toolkit, a C++ software library
 The NeWS Toolkit, an early Unix GUI library
 RIVA TNT, a computer graphics chipset by Nvidia.

People
 Greg Bownds (born 1977), Australian wrestler
 Savio Vega (born 1964), Puerto Rican wrestler
 Gloria, Princess of Thurn and Taxis (born 1960), "Princess TNT"
 Princess Elisabeth von Thurn und Taxis (born 1982), nickname "TNT"
 TNT (professional wrestling), a team

Other uses
 "Tago ng tago" (or "tago nang tago"), a Tagalog phrase referring to a Philippines national present in the United States without authorization
 Tissue nanotransfection, in medical science
 Tunneling nanotube, in cell biology
 Typographical Number Theory, in mathematics
 Dade-Collier Training and Transition Airport, Florida, US, IATA airport code
 TNT Creek, in Oregon
 Tornado Naked Tre, motorcycles by Benelli

See also
 
 

th:ทีเอ็นที